Lipănești is a commune in Prahova County, Muntenia, Romania. It is composed of four villages: Lipănești, Satu Nou, Șipotu and Zamfira.

Zamfira Monastery is located in Lipănești.

Natives
 Viorel Mateianu

References

Communes in Prahova County
Localities in Muntenia